Paul Würtz (also Würz or Wirtz) (30 October 1612 - 23 March 1676) was a German officer and diplomat, who at various times was in German, Swedish, Danish, and Dutch service.

Life 

He was born in Husum, Dithmarschen.

During his tenure as governor of Cracow, during Swedish-Transilvanian occupation of the city between 1655–1657, he is renowned for looting and destruction of many priceless works of art, including silver sarcophagus of Saint Stanislaus dating to 1630 and silver altar created in 1512, both from the Wawel Cathedral.

He was a Swedish Pomeranian general major and commander of the Stettin fortress from 1657 to 1659. He successfully withstood a siege of Brandenburgian troops in 1659, in a counterattack captured their ammunition depot, and forced their withdrawal. From 1661 to 1664, he was vice governor of Swedish Pomerania.

Gallery

References

Sources
Werner Buchholz, Pommern, Siedler, 1999, pp. 274,276,

See also
Swedish Pomerania
History of Pomerania

1612 births
1676 deaths
Swedish Pomerania